Zeytinburnu Belediyespor, short for , is the ice hockey team of Zeytinburnu Belediye S.K. in Istanbul, Turkey founded by the Municipality of Zeytinburnu district in 2010. Currently, the team compete in the Turkish Ice Hockey Super League (TBHSL) and play their home matches in Silivrikapı Ice Skating Hall. The club's colors are blue, white and red.

History
In 2010, the Municipality of Zeytinburnu erected two mobile ice-rinks of each  in the frame of a social responsibility project called "Doğaya destek sizden, buz pateni biletiniz bizden" (literally: You Support the Nature, We Award the Ticket for Ice Skating) to promote recycling. Citizens were awarded free tickets for ice skating session for the duration of half-an-hour under supervision of trainers in exchange for waste brought to recycle. Street children in the district, who are coming from poor families of mostly southeastern and eastern Anatolian origin with up to 10–12 children, collected waste paper to get free tickets. However, some of them tried to enter without a ticket, caused trouble around the venue, threatened the employees and damaged the ice rink. Noticing the youngsters' interest in ice skating, the municipality officials gave them in the beginning free-of-charge sessions instead of calling in for further security measures. The increasing interest of the street children induced the district mayor Murat Aydın to form an ice hockey team with the support of the Turkish Ice Hockey Federation (TBHF).

The team was established on May 29, 2010. Around twenty youngsters joined the team. Training and playing ice hockey in a team helped rehabilitate the children, many of whom were drug addicted or smokers, and resume their high school education. The addicts with social troubles were transformed into gentile sportspeople.

The team played in the Marmara Region Division of the Turkish Ice Hockey First League (TBHBL), the second-level league in Turkey. In the first two seasons, the team lost all league games with high score. The number of players as street children dropped to eight. By and by, the team transferred also professional ice hockey players. Success came in the 2012–13 season. Composed of players aged 17 to 19, Zeytinburnu Belediyespor became regional league leader, and was promoted at the end to the Turkish Ice Hockey Super League (TBHSL).

The club formed also a farm team consisting of 35 minors aged between 10 and 12, who were selected as talented.

Achievements

Turkish League
The 2012–13 season of the Turkish Ice Hockey First League ended for Zeytinburnu Belediyespor ranking at second place following a defeat by Gümüş Patenler in the play-off final. The team was promoted to the Super League (TBHSL).

The team finished the 2013–14 season as runner-up in their first presence in the TBHSL after losing to Izmir BB GSK in the play-off final.

They became champion in the 2014–15 and 2015–16 seasons, beating their rival from İzmir in the play-offs.

Statistics

Continental Cup
Zeytinburnu BS took part at the 2015–16 IIHF Continental Cup's Group A matches. They won two matches of the three, and failed to advance to the further round.

They participated at the 2016–17 IIHF Continental Cup. They played three matches of the first round in Group A held in Sofia, Bulgaria. Beating all their opponents, they became group champion, and advanced to the second round, which will be held in Jaca, Spain.

Current roster
.

Coaching staff
.

 General Manager: Emre Birinci
 Head coach:  Deniz İnce
 Goaltending Coach: Anders Jespersen
 Development Coach: Anders Jespersen

Former foreign players

 Evan Zych (2014–2015)

 Anton Peronmaa (2014–2017)
 Riku Arim (2015–2016)
 Rami Heikkilä (2015–2016)

 Nafi Kaya (2014–2016)

 Ryan Alves (2015–2016)
 Ryan Bahl (2015–2016)
 Tyler Holske (2015–2016)

References

External links
Official website 

Ice hockey teams in Turkey
Turkish Ice Hockey Super League teams
Sport in Istanbul
Ice hockey clubs established in 2010
2010 establishments in Turkey
Zeytinburnu